The 1948 ICF Canoe Sprint World Championships were held in London, Great Britain. This event was held under the auspices of the International Canoe Federation, formed in 1946 from the Internationale Repräsentantenschaft Kanusport (IRK).

The men's competition consisted of four kayak events. One kayak event was held for the women. The women's distance was reduced from 600 m to 500 m at these championships. These events were extraordinary since they were not included in the 1948 Summer Olympics, also held in London.

This was the second championships in flatwater racing and the first one after World War II ended.

Medal summary

Men's kayak

Women's kayak

Medals table

References

International Canoe Federation
ICF medalists for Olympic and World Championships - Part 1: flatwater (now sprint): 1936-2007.
ICF medalists for Olympic and World Championships - Part 2: rest of flatwater (now sprint) and remaining canoeing disciplines: 1936-2007.

Icf Canoe Sprint World Championships, 1948
Icf Canoe Sprint World Championships, 1948
ICF Canoe Sprint World Championships
Squash competitions in London
Icf Canoe Sprint World Championships
Canoeing and kayaking competitions in the United Kingdom
Canoeing in England